A coaxial power connector is an electrical power connector used for attaching extra-low voltage devices such as consumer electronics to external electricity. Also known as barrel connectors, concentric barrel connectors or tip connectors, these small cylindrical connectors come in an enormous variety of sizes.

Barrel plug connectors are commonly used to interface the secondary side of a power supply with the device. Some of these jacks contain a normally closed switch; the switch can disconnect internal batteries whenever the external power supply is connected.

Connector construction and terminology 
The connector pairs for barrel connectors are defined in terms of "plugs" and "receptacles"; receptacles are more commonly called "sockets" or "jacks" in the United States. Receptacles may be panel-mounted or circuit board-mounted. Plugs are on cables. Some in-line receptacles are also cable-mounted.

Power is generally supplied by a plug to a receptacle. Cables are available with one in-line receptacle fanning out to a number of plugs, so that many devices may be supplied by one supply. As the use of a plug implies a cable, even a short stub, some power supplies carry panel-mounted receptacles instead to avoid this cable. Cables for such cases are available with a plug at each end, although cables or adapters with two receptacles are not widely available.

Plug (female)
On the plug, the outer body is metallic and cylindrical in shape, and comprises one of the two contacts. The second, inside contact is a hollow metallic cylinder constructed to accept insertion of the pin in the corresponding socket. The inner and outer barrels are separated by an insulating layer, which is flared at the tip to prevent a short circuit when the plug is inserted or removed.

Socket or receptacle 
There is typically a single spring-loaded contact at the side of the socket and a pin in the center.

Connector sizes
There are many different sizes of coaxial power connectors. See the table at the end of this article.

Contact ratings commonly vary from unspecified up to 5 A (11 A for special high-power versions). Voltage is often unspecified, but may be up to 48 V with 12 V typical. The smaller types usually have lower current and voltage ratings.

It is quite possible that new sizes will continue to appear and disappear. One possible reason that a particular manufacturer may use a new size is to discourage use of third-party power supplies, either for technical reasons or to force use of their own accessories, or both.

The sizes and shapes of connectors do not consistently correspond to the same power specifications across manufacturers and models. Two connectors from different manufacturers with different sizes could potentially be attached to power supplies with the same voltage and current. Alternatively, connectors of the same size can be part of power supplies with different voltages and currents. Use of the wrong power supply may cause severe equipment damage, or even fire.

Common sizes and interchangeability 

Generic plugs are often described by their inside diameter, such as 2.1 mm DC plugs and 2.5 mm DC (direct current) plugs.

After the two common 5.5 mm OD (Outer Diameter) plugs, the next-most common size is 3.5 mm OD with a 1.3 mm ID (Inner Diameter), usually about 9.5 mm in length, although both longer and shorter versions also exist. These 3.5 mm OD plugs are normally used for lower voltages and currents.

Locking and retention features 
A ring-shaped "locking detent" or "high-retention feature", present on the barrel of some DC coaxial connectors, is a feature intended to prevent accidental disconnection. Typically, this feature is a conical cut-back section of the tip, just behind the insulator that separates the inner from outer contact surfaces.

A "lock-ring DC coaxial connector" uses a captive threaded ring or collar to secure the connection between the plug and jack. This design offers strong resistance to unplugging when used properly.

A "lock-tab DC coaxial connector" (also called "bayonet lock") offers a compromise that resists unplugging, but which will disengage when pulled hard enough. This connector uses small metal tab protrusions on the connector barrel to lock the plug in place, requiring a special push-and-rotate motion to engage the locks.

Standards

There are several standards in existence, provided by bodies such as the IEC, EIAJ in Japan and DIN in Germany. More recently, some manufacturers appear to have implemented their own system correlating voltage and plug size. In addition, there appears to be a trend to standardize DC connector to negative barrel (or sleeve) of a coaxial power connector.

IEC 60130-10
International standard IEC 60130-10:1971 defines five DC power connectors:

Type A: 5.5 mm OD, 2.1 mm ID (with optional screw lock)
Type A: 5.5 mm OD, 2.5 mm ID (with optional screw lock)
Type B: 6.0 mm OD, 2.1 mm ID
Type B: 6.0 mm OD, 2.5 mm ID
Type C: 3.8 mm OD, 1.1 mm ID
Type D: 6.3 mm OD, 3.1 mm ID
Type E: 3.4 mm OD, 1.3 mm ID

EIAJ power connector
The Japanese trade organization EIAJ issued EIAJ RC-5320A, which defines five plug and matching socket or jack sizes. Each of these plugs is used with a specified voltage range. Most manufacturers use colored insulating materials to distinguish these plugs from other similar-looking DC plugs, and for quick identification between EIAJ plugs of similar size.

EIAJ-01: For 0–3.15 V. 2.5 mm OD, 0.7 mm ID.
EIAJ-02: For 3.15–6.3 V. 4.0 mm OD, 1.7 mm ID.
EIAJ-03: For 6.3–10.5 V. 5.0 mm OD, 1.7 mm ID.
EIAJ-04 (also called JSBP 4): For 10.5–13.5 V. 5.5 mm OD, 3.4 mm ID.
EIAJ-05 (also called JSBP 5): For 13.5–18 V. 6.5 mm OD, 4.4 mm ID.

EIAJ-04 and 05 have an internal male pin in the plug. The 01 through 03 sizes do not and are similar to the generic plugs in structure. These five EIAJ plugs are 9.5 mm in length and have a current rating of 2A.

There are two other, less common, connectors defined by EIAJ; RC-5321 and RC-5322. The latter is designed for both 12 V and 24 V automotive applications.

DIN 45323
The German national standards organization DIN (Deutsches Institut für Normung—German Institute for Standardization) issued DIN 45323, which defines two DC power plug and jack (respectively) sizes. At least one of these sizes has a maximum rating of 34 V and 3 A. The information here is inferred from catalog references, as the German standard has not been translated into English yet.

5.00 mm OD, 2.00 mm ID, 14 mm long?
6.00 mm OD, 1.98 mm ID

Listing of DC coaxial connectors 

This list attempts to show all known sizes, and is annotated with some manufacturers producing selected types, since each manufacturer makes its own unique subset of the known types. Note that the example part numbers given may have different connector barrel (sleeve) lengths, and are not necessarily exact equivalents. There are many more design variants than can be listed in this table, so only a small sampling of part numbers is given.

Connector size is often listed in the format OD (outer diameter) × ID (inner diameter) × L (length of barrel) and expressed in millimeters. Designations may vary between manufacturers.

Coaxial plugs that have a male center pin will have another measurement, Center Pin Diameter (CPD). These plugs are often used for higher power applications such as portable computers.

There are a number of sizes listed below that appear to be quite similar, and while the tolerances of these connectors are typically indicated as ±0.05 or ±0.03 mm by the manufacturers, there is still ambiguity as to whether two sizes differing by only 0.05 mm (or where the specification is only given to the nearest 0.10 mm) warrants listing them separately here.

In the following table, the term Adaptaplug refers to the Radioshack reference (see next section in this article).

RadioShack Adaptaplug
RadioShack sold a line of adapter plugs for universal AC adapters. Each "Adaptaplug" had a single-letter code, but did not provide any other official designation, nor did RadioShack publish the complete specifications and tolerances on barrel and pin dimensions. RadioShack's Web site listed the diameters to the nearest 0.1 mm, and sometimes differs slightly from the official EIAJ RC-5320A standard dimensions. This list may include some parts RadioShack has discontinued but are retained here for completeness.

See also 

 AC adapter
 Anderson Powerpole
 Cigarette lighter receptacle
 DC connector
 Gender of connectors and fasteners

References

External links
 Guide to Understanding Power Conversion, RadioShack
Datasheets (drawings and dimensions)
 CUI Devices
 Hosiden
 Lumberg
 SMK
 West Side

Electrical power connectors
DC power connectors
Gender in language